Don't Tell Her (or Faut pas lui dire) is a 2016 French-Belgian comedy film directed and written by Solange Cicurel. It received two nominations at the 8th Magritte Awards, winning Best First Feature Film.

Plot
Laura, Eve, Anouk and Yael are cousins and have one thing in common, they lie but always out of love! When the first three discover a few weeks before the wedding of Yael that her perfect fiancé is cheating on her, they vote in unison "Don't Tell Her".

Cast
 Jenifer as Laura Brunel
 Camille Chamoux as Eve Brunel
 Tania Garbarski as Anouch
 Stéphanie Crayencour as Yaël
 Arié Elmaleh as Maxime Leclercq
 Laurent Capelluto as Daniel Kantarian
 Fabrizio Rongione as Alain Grégoire
 Charlie Dupont as Jonathan Levi
 Clément Manuel as Stéphane Jonet
 Benjamin Bellecour as Ben
 Stéphane Debac as David
 Brigitte Fossey

References

External links
 

2016 films
2016 comedy films
Belgian comedy films
French comedy films
2010s French-language films
Films set in France
Magritte Award winners
2010s French films